Elizaveta Dmitrievna Kulichkova (born 12 April 1996) is a Russian former tennis player. She competed for her last pro match at the 2017 US Open

In her career, she won seven singles titles on the ITF Circuit. On 22 February 2016, she reached her best singles ranking of world No. 87.

Kulichkova was ranked the No. 3 junior tennis player in the world in May 2012, and in January 2014, won the girls' singles and doubles events at the Australian Open.

Career
Kulichkova made her WTA Tour main-draw debut at the 2014 İstanbul Cup as a qualifier. Having defeated Nadiia Kichenok and Melinda Czink in the preliminary rounds, she lost to Shahar Pe'er in round one. Further first-round exits followed in Hong Kong and Seoul before once again coming through qualifying in Tianjin, where she defeated Sílvia Soler Espinosa, before losing to Peng Shuai in the second round.

Kulichkova made her major debut at the 2015 Wimbledon Championships by defeating Yanina Wickmayer (3–6, 7–6, 10–8) before losing to further quarterfinalist Madison Keys in the second round (4–6, 6–7). Then she reached semifinals in Bursa. In the first round at Baku, she was close to defeat top seed Anastasia Pavlyuchenkova but she lost the final tie-breaker.

For the first time Kulichkova was nominated for the Russia Fed Cup team in 2016 in the World Group Play-offs against Belarus. She should have played the last dead rubber with Elena Vesnina, but she was replaced by Daria Kasatkina.

Grand Slam performance timelines

Singles

Doubles

ITF finals

Singles: 9 (7 titles, 2 runner–ups)

Doubles: 1 (runner–up)

Junior Grand Slam tournament finals

Girls' singles: 1 (title)

Girls' doubles: 1 (title)

References

External links

 
 

1996 births
Living people
Sportspeople from Novosibirsk
Russian female tennis players
Australian Open (tennis) junior champions
Grand Slam (tennis) champions in girls' singles
Grand Slam (tennis) champions in girls' doubles